The Violin Concerto, Op. 54, is a three-movement concertante composition for violin and orchestra written in 1952 by the Swedish composer Lars-Erik Larsson. The piece premiered over Swedish Radio on 11 January 1953 in Stockholm, Sweden, with  conducting the Swedish Radio Orchestra. The soloist was the Hungarian violinist André Gertler, its dedicatee.

In 1976, Larsson wrote a new cadenza to Movement I.

Structure
The Violin Concerto is in three movements. They are as follows:

Instrumentation
The Violin Concerto is scored the following instruments:

Soloist: violin
Woodwinds: 2 flutes, 2 oboes, 2 clarinets (in A; later in B), and 2 bassoons
Brass: 4 horns (in F), 2 trumpets (in C), 3 trombones, and tuba
Percussion: timpani
Strings: violins, violas, cellos, and double basses

 published the piece in 1956.

Recordings
The sortable table below lists commercially available recordings of the Violin Concerto:

Notes, references, and sources

 
 
 

Compositions by Lars-Erik Larsson
20th-century classical music
Classical music in Sweden
1952 compositions
Larsson